The School of Letters was a summer institute and degree-granting (M.A. and Ph.D. minor) program at  Indiana University, Bloomington. The school moved from Kenyon College in 1951 following the withdrawal of funding of the School of English by the Rockefeller Foundation. I.U. President Herman B. Wells obtained funding from the university and located the school under the administration of Dean John W. Ashton of the College of Arts and Sciences. The school opened under the direction of Prof. Richard B. Hudson and then transitioned to Prof. Newton P. 'Stalky' Stallknecht until his retirement and the school's dissolution in 1972.

Founding
When Indiana University moved the school from Kenyon to Bloomington they maintained John Crowe Ransom, Lionel Trilling, Philip Rahv, Austin Warren, and Allen Tate as senior fellows, all well-known literary scholars. The Kenyon School of English was founded by three senior fellows, John Crowe Ransom, F. O. Matthiessen and Lionel Trilling and was held during a summer session at Kenyon College from 1948 until 1950. The first session of the School of Letters in Bloomington ran from June 21 to August 1, 1951.

Mission statement

The school's impact

Students at the School of Letters included James M. Cox '51 (later would become a faculty member at Indiana University and the School), Martha Banta '62, Bruce Jackson '62, Paul Lauter '55, and Geoffrey H. Hartman '51. The School existed during a period of major change within the field of literary studies from the dominance of New Criticism until the rise of post-structuralism. During each session of the School high profile academics, poets, and critics were brought to Bloomington to teach seminars and deliver weekly forum lectures. These instructors included Northrop Frye, William Empson, John Berryman, Robert Lowell, Leslie Fiedler, and R. P. Blackmur.

References 

Humanities
Indiana University
1951 establishments in Indiana
Educational institutions established in 1951
Educational institutions disestablished in 1972
Kenyon College